A birthday cake is a cake eaten as part of a birthday celebration. Birthday cakes are often layer cakes with frosting served with small lit candles on top representing the celebrant's age. Variations include cupcakes, cake pops, pastries, and tarts. The cake is often decorated with birthday wishes ("Happy birthday") and the celebrant's name.

History

Birthday cakes have been a part of birthday celebrations in Western European countries since the middle of the 19th century. However, the link between cakes and birthday celebrations may date back to ancient Roman times; in classical Roman culture, cakes were occasionally served at special birthdays and at weddings. These were flat circles made from flour and nuts, leavened with yeast, and sweetened with honey.

In the 15th century, bakeries in Germany began to market one-layer cakes for customers' birthdays in addition to cakes for weddings. During the 17th century, the birthday cake took on its contemporary form. These elaborate cakes had many aspects of the contemporary birthday cake, like multiple layers, icing, and decorations. However, these cakes were only available to the very wealthy. Birthday cakes became accessible to the lower class as a result of the industrial revolution and the spread of more materials and goods.

Contemporary rites

The cake, pastry, or dessert is served to a person on their birthday. In contemporary Western cultures, the cake is topped with one or more lit candles, which the celebrated individual attempts to blow out.

There is no standard for birthday cakes, though the "Happy Birthday" song is often sung while the cake is served in English-speaking countries, or an equivalent birthday song in the appropriate language of the country. The phrase "happy birthday" did not appear on birthday cakes until the song "Happy Birthday to You" was popularized in the early 1900s. Variations of birthday songs and rituals exist in different parts of the world. In Uruguay, party guests touch the person's shoulder or head following the singing of "Happy Birthday to You". In Ecuador, the person whose birthday it is will take a large bite of the birthday cake before it is served. In Peru, guests sing "Happy Birthday to You" first in English with the name of the individual whose birthday it is, then in Spanish, later they sing any other song in Spanish regarding cake or date, finally blowing candles and serving the cake.

The birthday cake is often decorated with small candles, secured with special holders or simply pressed down into the cake. The cake can also be served with other sweets such as ice cream. In the UK, North America and Australia, the number of candles is usually equal to the age of the individual whose birthday it is, sometimes with one extra for luck. Traditionally, the person whose birthday it is makes a wish, which is thought to come true if all the candles are extinguished in a single breath.

Candles and theories of origin

In many cultures the person whose birthday is being celebrated is invited to make a wish, and blow out candles. Though the exact origin and significance of this ritual is unknown, there are multiple theories which try to explain this tradition.

Greek origin story
One theory explaining the tradition of placing candles on birthday cakes is attributed to the early Greeks, who used candles to honor the goddess Artemis' birth on the sixth day of every lunar month. The link between her oversight of fertility and the birthday tradition of candles on cakes, however, has not been established.

Pagan origin story

The use of fire in certain rites dates back to the creation of altars. Birthday candles are said to hold symbolic power.

In the past it was believed that evil spirits visited people on their birthdays and that, to protect the person whose birthday it was from evil, people must surround the individual and make them merry. Party-goers made noise to scare away evil spirits.

German origin story

In 18th century Germany, the history of candles on cakes can be traced back to Kinderfest, a birthday celebration for children. This tradition also makes use of candles and cakes. German children were taken to an auditorium-like space. There, they were free to celebrate another year in a place where Germans believed that adults protected children from the evil spirits attempting to steal their souls. In those times there was no tradition of bringing gifts to a birthday; guests would merely bring good wishes for the birthday person. However, if a guest did bring gifts it was considered to be a good sign for the person whose birthday it was. Later, flowers became quite popular as a birthday gift.
 In 1746, a large birthday festival was held for Count Ludwig von Zinzendorf at Marienborn near Büdingen. Andrew Frey described the party in detail and mentions, "there was a Cake as large as any Oven could be found to bake it, and Holes made in the Cake according to the Years of the Person's Age, every one having a Candle stuck into it, and one in the Middle."
 Johann Wolfgang von Goethe, having spent 24–30 August 1801 in Gotha as a guest of Prince August of Saxe-Gotha-Altenburg, recounts of his 52nd birthday on 28 August: "when it was time for dessert, the prince's entire livery in full regalia entered, led by the majordomo. He carried a generous-size torte with colorful flaming candles – amounting to some fifty candles – that began to melt and threatened to burn down, instead of there being enough room for candles indicating upcoming years, as is the case with children's festivities of this kind." As the excerpt indicates, the tradition at the time was to place one candle on the cake for each year of the individual's life, so that the number of candles on top of the cake would represent the age which some one had reached; sometimes a birthday cake would have some added candles 'indicating upcoming years.'

Swiss origin story
A reference to the tradition of blowing out the candles was documented in Switzerland in 1881. Researchers for the Folk-Lore Journal recorded various "superstitions" among the Swiss middle class. One statement depicted a birthday cake as having lighted candles which correspond to each year of life. These candles were required to be blown out, individually, by the person who is being celebrated.

Bacteriology
In June 2017 researchers at Clemson University reported that some individuals deposit a large number of bacteria on the cake.

Birthday cakes in different cultures

There are many variations of sweets which are eaten around the world on birthdays. Rather than serving one large pastry, each guest is served their own small . In Western Russia, birthday children are served fruit pies with a birthday greeting carved into the crusts. The Swedish birthday cake is made like a pound cake that is often topped with marzipan and decorated with the national flag. Dutch birthday pastries are fruit tarts topped with whipped cream. In India there are very few people who celebrate birthdays in the villages, but in cities and towns, birthday cakes are consumed similarly as in Western countries, especially among people with higher education.

Gallery

See also
 Wedding cake
 List of desserts
 Birthday
 Rite of passage

References

External links

Cakes
Birthdays
Traditions
Holiday foods